The 2020 season was Perak FC's 16th consecutive season in Malaysia Super League, the top flight of Malaysian football. The club also will participate in the Malaysia FA Cup, Malaysia Cup and the AFC Champions League.

Management team

Players

Transfers

In
1st leg

2nd leg

Loan in
1st leg

Loan out
2nd leg

Out
1st leg

2nd leg

Friendlies

Friendlies

Competitions

Malaysia Super League

League table

Results by matchday

Matches
The Malaysian Football League (MFL) announced the fixtures for the 2019 season on 22 December 2018.

AFC Champions League

Qualifying play-offs

Malaysia FA Cup

Malaysia Cup

Group stage

Statistics

Appearances and goals

Summary

References

Perak F.C. seasons
Malaysian football clubs 2019 season